Seomyeon Medical Street refers to a medical district in Busanjin-gu, Busan named after and centered on the thoroughfare within a  radius of the Seomyeon Lotte Department Store and Buam Station. It is one of three medical districts being devised by the Government of Busan and is the most concentrated in all of South Korea.

Background
Located in Seomyeon near the Judies Taehwa shopping mall, Seomyeon Medical Street is home to a total of 160 cosmetic and other medical clinics, including those specializing in cosmetic surgery, dermatology, ophthalmology and dentistry. The Street area also provides a wide range of amenities and entertainment venues, including five-star hotel, large department store, large discount store, duty-free shop, casino, restaurants, beauty salon and clothing outlets.

Medical tourism
The district's popularity amongst medical tourists from Russia, China, Japan and the United States has seen an influx in recent history. This has prompted city officials to invest  into the area, as well as found an information center and provide access to tour guides fluent in Chinese, English and Japanese.

See also
Seomyeon Station
Harley Street

References

Geography of Busan
Tourist attractions in Busan
Medical districts
Busanjin District